The MKO Abiola Park is a public park located at the Ikododu Road - Lagos/Ibadan Expressway Interchange in Ojota, Lagos. The green space was named after the Late Nigerian Politician and Philanthropist MKO Abiola. The park has a wide green landscape, some monuments and seats for relaxation. In June 2018, a 46 feet statue of MKO Abiola was situated in the park to honor his cause.

Gallery

References

Parks in Lagos